Crossair Flight 3597 was a scheduled flight from Berlin Tegel Airport, Germany, to Zürich Airport, Switzerland. On 24 November 2001, the Crossair Avro RJ100 operating the route, registration  crashed into a wooded range of hills near Bassersdorf and caught fire, killing 24 of the 33 people on board. The crash was also known as The Day Euro-Dance Music Died – a reference to the 1959 crash that became known as The Day the Music Died – due to the deaths of some members of Euro-Dance groups La Bouche and Passion Fruit.

Aircraft
The accident aircraft, a British-made Avro 146-RJ100, registration HB-IXM, was manufactured in 1996 and logged more than 13,000 hours and 11,500 cycles in total before the crash. The aircraft was powered by four Lycoming LF507-1F turbofan engines.

Accident
Flight 3597 departed Berlin Tegel Airport at 21:01 CET with 28 passengers, three flight attendants, and the cockpit crew consisting of Captain Hans Ulrich Lutz (57) and First Officer Stefan Löhrer (25). Lutz was a highly experienced pilot with more than 19,500 flight hours, approximately 19,300 of which were as pilot in command. Löhrer, in contrast, was inexperienced, with just 490 total flight hours.

Upon arrival in Zürich airspace, about an hour after takeoff, the pilots were cleared for an instrument landing system (ILS) approach to runway 14, but were switched to a VOR/DME (VHF Omnidirectional Range/Distance Measuring Equipment) approach to runway 28 due to a noise abatement statute after 10:00 p.m. At 22:07 CET, Flight 3597 crashed into a wooded range of hills near the small town of Bassersdorf, around  short of the runway, where it broke apart and burst into flames. Twenty-four people died, including the cockpit crew and a flight attendant, while seven passengers and two flight attendants survived.

Passengers

Flight 3597 was carrying a total of 33 people. Five crew members and 28 passengers were on board.

Among the passengers killed in the crash were Melanie Thornton, the former American lead singer of the German Euro-Dance duo La Bouche, and singers Nathaly van het Ende and Maria Serrano Serrano of the German Euro-Dance trio Passion Fruit; the group's third singer, Debby St. Maarten survived with major injuries.

Investigation

While Captain Lutz was an experienced pilot, his competence soon came under close scrutiny by investigators from the Swiss Aircraft Accident Investigation Bureau (AAIB). The AAIB would conclude that the accident was a controlled flight into terrain (CFIT) caused by a series of pilot errors and navigation mistakes that led the plane off-course.

Flight 3597 had originally been scheduled to land on runway 14, the main landing runway at Zürich, which was equipped with an ILS system that provides vertical and lateral guidance to the runway. The CVR records Lutz and Löhrer discussing "the 14 approach" as well as Lutz's request that Löhrer call out the height when the plane reached 100 feet above DA (decision altitude – the altitude at which an immediate decision to land or initiate a missed approach must be made). However, Flight 3597 was behind schedule and would not reach Zürich until after 22:00 CET, necessitating a change to its landing plan. Zürich ATC, in order to comply with a new Swiss law designed to reduce airport noise from approaching aircraft over southern Germany in the late evening hours, redirected all flights on final approach to switch from the ILS-equipped runway 14 to the less-accurate VOR/DME-equipped runway 28. This runway change forced Lutz to abandon his planned ILS approach and required Löhrer to consult the Jeppesen charts for runway 28. The charts included a new set of approach parameters, of which the higher minimum descent altitude (MDA) was the most crucial piece of information.

The MDA states the minimum altitude in MSL to safely fly above any obstructions or terrain in the final approach flight-path before visual contact with the runway is made. Unlike a DA in a precision approach, an MDA requires that after crossing the Final Approach Fix, the pilot should descend and maintain MDA until the pilot reports that the runway is in sight, allowing the landing to safely be completed visually. In contrast to the ILS approach, which displays lateral and vertical position, the VOR/DME approach only shows the lateral position of the aircraft and its range to the runway. Due to increased azimuth error associated with the use of VORs and lack of vertical guidance (glide slope), the MDA is therefore often higher than a DA (Decision Altitude) for an ILS.

Although both pilots were based in Zürich and the CVR picks up Lutz's query to Löhrer about Löhrer's familiarity with "the 28 approach", which Löhrer confirmed he had, Lutz put the plane into an overly-steep descent that brought Flight 3597 to MDA far too soon. When Löhrer reported the plane reaching 100 feet above MDA, the CVR records Lutz asking Löhrer, "Do we have ground contact?" Löhrer hesitated before replying, "Yes". However, flight simulators programmed with the time of day, terrain, and weather Lutz was facing at that time allowed investigators to determine that the only ground Lutz or Löhrer could see was the ground of the hilly terrain over which the plane was flying. The fact that Löhrer made no attempt to prevent the continuation of the flight below the MDA also contributed to the crash. Moments before the crash, Lutz's running commentary indicated to investigators that he thought he was at or near  from runway 28 because he said, "Someone said he saw the runway late here". Just before the crash, the synthetic voice of the ground proximity warning system (GPWS) announced the radio altimeter reading 500 feet above ground. Lutz exclaimed, "Shit, two miles he said, he sees the runway!" A few seconds later Lutz said, "Two thousand" and then one second later the synthetic voice gave the "minimums" GPWS message, which was triggered by the radio altimeter reading at 300 feet. Even though Lutz finally realized that his inability to see the runway meant he needed to initiate a missed approach maneuver (called a "go-around"), his call for the go-around came too late; the plane's engines were not able to spool up fast enough to generate sufficient thrust to climb above the hill that had been obstructing his view, and the plane crashed into the hilltop at 22:06 CET.

Final report
The AAIB report determined that Lutz had failed to perform correct navigation and landing procedures on previous occasions, but no action had been taken by Crossair to remove him from transporting passengers. Lutz had twice failed to upgrade his flight certifications to the more complex MD-83 due to insufficient comprehension of its computerized navigational systems. The report also documented Lutz's role in causing the total loss of a Crossair Saab 340 by retracting its landing gear while it was still on the apron, which led to Crossair relieving him of his flight instructing duties in 1991.

In spite of those demonstrated deficiencies, however, Crossair continued to allow Lutz to fly passengers (reportedly due to a shortage of qualified pilots), and he continued to demonstrate his overall deficiencies as a line pilot. These included a near-miss incident on final approach to Lugano Airport where Lutz came within  of colliding with the shore of Lake Lugano during a dangerous -per-minute descent and a navigational error during a sightseeing tour over the Alps that took the flight far off its course to Sion. In this particular incident, Lutz missed his approach into Sion and circled over what he thought was Sion's airport for several minutes before passengers spotted road signs in Italian; the navigational error had taken them over the Great St Bernard Pass, and the airport they had been circling was in fact Aosta Valley Airport in Italy.

The final report of the AAIB states that other factors also contributed to the accident:

 The range of hills the plane crashed into was not marked in the Jeppesen approach chart used by the crew.
 Despite the hilly terrain surrounding it, the approach to runway 28 was not equipped with a Minimum Safe Altitude Warning (MSAW) system, which triggers an alarm if a minimum safe altitude is violated.
 Zürich Airport's means of determining visibility were inadequate for runway 28.
 The visual minimums at the time of the accident were actually inappropriate for using the standard approach to runway 28.
 An inexperienced air traffic controller was alone in the control tower. A more experienced controller might have allowed the flight to land on runway 14 because of the poor weather conditions.

Dramatization 
The hourlong Discovery Channel Canada / National Geographic TV series Mayday featured the crash in a Season 10 episode titled Cockpit Failure.

See also 

 Korean Air Flight 801
 Asiana Airlines Flight 733
 Air China Flight 129
 Thai Airways International Flight 311, a CFIT accident.
 Turkish Airlines Flight 634
 Henan Airlines Flight 8387
 TransAsia Airways Flight 222
 Alitalia Flight 404, another CFIT accident near Zurich
 American Airlines Flight 965
 2020 Calabasas helicopter crash, another CFIT accident which led to the death of basketball player Kobe Bryant
 Air Inter Flight 148

Notes

References

External links 
 Final report on the crash  (Alternative) (Archive) – Aircraft Accident Investigation Bureau
Report  (Archive)  (Original)
 Report  (Archive) 
 Crossair Status of the Accident Investigation
 Accident Description at the Aviation Safety Network

Aviation accidents and incidents in 2001
Aviation accidents and incidents in Switzerland
Airliner accidents and incidents involving controlled flight into terrain
Accidents and incidents involving the British Aerospace 146
Airliner accidents and incidents caused by pilot error
3597
November 2001 events in Europe
2001 disasters in Switzerland